The International Society of Surgery, or the Societe Internationale de Chirurgie, is an international society of surgeons founded in 1902.

It contributes to raising awareness of accessing surgery worldwide.

When the International Society of Surgery (ISS) was adopted from the Societe Internationale de Chirurgie (SIC), its home office transferred to Berne, Switzerland. At the time, Martin Allgower was the Secretary General and a meeting was arranged every two years. The ISS shortly hosted and attracted other surgical societies to form a surgical week.

References 

1902 establishments in Switzerland
Surgical organizations